Lucy Brown (born 1979) is an English actress.

Lucy Brown may also refer to:

 Lucy Brown (band), a 1990s Washington D.C. area funk-metal band
 Lucy Brown (1991 album)
 Lucy Barnes Brown (1859–1921), American amateur golfer
 Lucy Brown (tennis) (born 1993), British tennis player
 Lucy Brown, a character in The Threepenny Opera
 Lucy Brown, a British tennis player with a WTA ranking high of 540 in the world
 Lucy Hughes Brown (1863–1911), first African-American woman physician in South Carolina
 Lucy Madox Brown (1843–1894), British artist, author and model